Tokyo Jukebox is the eighth studio album by the American guitarist, producer and arranger Marty Friedman. It consists entirely of Japanese song covers, chosen by him and the readers of Nikkei Entertainment!.

Track listing

2009 albums
Marty Friedman albums
Covers albums